In enzymology, an alpha-santonin 1,2-reductase is an enzyme that catalyzes the chemical reaction

1,2-dihydrosantonin + NAD(P)+  alpha-santonin + NAD(P)H + H+

The 3 substrates of this enzyme are 1,2-dihydrosantonin, NAD+, and NADP+, whereas its 4 products are alpha-santonin, NADH, NADPH, and H+.

This enzyme belongs to the family of oxidoreductases, specifically those acting on the CH-CH group of donor with NAD+ or NADP+ as acceptor.  The systematic name of this enzyme class is 1,2-dihydrosantonin:NAD(P)+ 1,2-oxidoreductase.

References

 

EC 1.3.1
NADPH-dependent enzymes
NADH-dependent enzymes
Enzymes of unknown structure